Parkway West High School is a public comprehensive high school in Chesterfield, Missouri, US, that is part of the Parkway School District.

History
Parkway West High School (PWHS) was the second high school built in the Parkway School District; it opened in fall 1968 with grades 10-12. In the 1969–1970 school year, Parkway West Junior High was formed and grades 7-9 were housed in the West Senior building, operating on the same schedule as West Senior. For the 1970-71 school year, West Senior operated as a four-year high school (grades 9-12), with West Junior grades 7 and 8 attending Parkway South Junior High School on a split schedule. Members of the class of 1974 attended school in the West Senior building for five straight years. West Junior opened for the 1971–1972 school year with the new "open classroom" layout. One of the unusual features of PWHS was that for 13 years, under the leadership of principal Al Burr, it operated without any written rules or regulations—only mutual agreements and expectations.

Activities
For the 2013–2014 school year, the school offered 28 activities approved by the Missouri State High School Activities Association (MSHSAA): baseball, boys' and girls' basketball, sideline cheerleading, boys' and girls' cross country, dance team, field hockey, 11-man football, boys' and girls' golf, girls' lacrosse, music activities, scholar bowl, boys' and girls' soccer, softball, speech and debate, boys' and girls' swimming and diving, boys' and girls' tennis, boys' and girls' track and field, boys' and girls' volleyball, water polo and wrestling. Parkway West students have won several state championships, including:
Baseball: 1996
Boys' basketball: 1991
Boys' cross country: 1988, 1990
Girls' cross country: 1989, 1990
Girls' golf: 1980
Boys' soccer: 1986
Softball: 1988, 1992, 1993
Boys' volleyball: 2003, 2021
Water polo: 1984, 2012, 2014, 2021
Boys' swimming and diving: 1975, 1977, 1978, 1980, 1981, 1982, 1985, 1986, 1987, 1988, 1993
Girls' swimming and diving: 1977, 1978, 1979, 1980, 1981, 1982, 1985, 1986, 1987, 1988, 1994, 2011, 2020, 2021

Notable alumni
August Busch IV, ex-president and CEO of Anheuser-Busch
Chris Cissell, head coach of women's soccer at UMKC, NSCAA/Adidas NAIA Men's National Coach of the Year in 2006
Philip S. Davidson, admiral, US Navy
Blaine Gabbert, quarterback for the Tampa Bay Buccaneers and former quarterback for the Missouri Tigers
Matt Korklan, professional wrestler currently wrestling for Ring of Honor as Matt Sydal
Pooja Kumar, actress and former Miss India USA
Brian Krolicki, Lieutenant Governor of Nevada
Lucas May, catcher in the Kansas City Royals organization
Stone Phillips, former anchor of Dateline NBC, and gave the baccalaureate address for the Class of 1983 
James Rollins (James Czajkowski), New York Times best-selling author
Ken Schrader, NASCAR racer
Nikko Smith, singer–songwriter, top 12 in American Idol season 4 and son of St. Louis Cardinals Hall of Famer Ozzie Smith
Travis Stork, physician and TV personality most noted for appearing on The Bachelor season 8 and as host of the syndicated daytime talk show The Doctors
Tuc Watkins, actor most noted for his role on One Life to Live, also played neighbor Bob Hunter on Desperate Housewives, 2007–2009
Joe Williams, film critic of the St. Louis Post-Dispatch

References

 Educational institutions established in 1968
 High schools in St. Louis County, Missouri
 Public high schools in Missouri
1968 establishments in Missouri
 Buildings and structures in St. Louis County, Missouri